The Guernsey Party is a centre-right political party in Guernsey founded in 2020 by Mark Heylar.

The party ran 8 candidates in the 2020 Guernsey general election. Six were elected.

References

External links 
 Guernsey Party website

Political parties in Guernsey
2020 establishments in Guernsey
Political parties established in 2020